Millennium Bank may refer to:

 Portuguese Commercial Bank, a Portuguese bank that was founded in 1985, operating as Millennium BCP
 Bank Millennium, a subsidiary based in Poland
 Millennium Bank (Greece), a bank in Greece
 Millennium bim, the largest bank in Mozambique
 Millennium Seed Bank Partnership, an international conservation project